Deepika Singh Goyal (born 26 July, 1989) is an Indian television actress. She is known for playing the role of Sandhya Rathi in Star Plus's Diya Aur Baati Hum.

Early life 
Singh was born in New Delhi on 26 July 1989. She completed her Masters in Business Administration in Marketing at Punjab Technical University.

Career 
Singh made her television debut in 2011, in the serial Diya Aur Baati Hum on Star Plus, as the character Sandhya Kothari. She played the role for 5 years until the show went off air in September 2016.

In 2018 she was seen in a webseries called The Real Soulmate. She also became a contestant on Ekta Kapoor's Box Cricket League in 2014 and 2019. In 2019, Deepika made a comeback to television acting, as she portrayed the double role of twin sisters Sandhya and Sakshi Patwardhan in Colors TV's supernatural show Kavach... Mahashivratri.

She is reprised the role of Sandhya Rathi to film a promotion video for StarPlus's show Ghum Hai Kisikey Pyaar Meiin. The show is based on IPS Officer Virat Chavan and his marriage to Sai Joshi under unfavourable circumstances. Hence why Singh was asked to film a promo in her police officer get up from Diya Aur Baati Hum.

Personal life 
Singh married the director of her television show Rohit Raj Goyal on 2 May 2014 after which she changed her name to Deepika Singh Goyal. In January 2017, she announced her pregnancy news to the media and her fans. In May 2017, she gave birth to a baby boy and took a brief break from acting.

Singh has been training in the classical Odissi dance form.

Filmography

Film

Television

Special appearances

Awards

See also
 List of Indian television actresses

References

External links

 
 
 

1989 births
Living people
Actresses from Delhi
Indian television actresses
Indian soap opera actresses
Actresses in Hindi television